III: So Long Suckers is the third and final double album by Finnish doom metal band Reverend Bizarre.

The duration on the first CD (66:06) is not coincidental. The first draft at mastering the CD was adjusted by a few seconds to produce the three 6's in the duration.

The lyric "Christs may come and Christs may go but Caesar is forever" is lifted from the pamphlet Might Is Right by Ragnar Redbeard.

The fifth track on CD 2 is a secret track not mentioned on the back cover of the CD case. It also goes under the nickname "Mallorca".

Track listing

Credits 
 Albert Witchfinder – bass, vocals
 Peter Vicar – guitar
 Earl of Void – guitar, drums

References

Reverend Bizarre albums
2007 albums
Spinefarm Records albums